The following buildings are known as Merchant(s) Hotel:

 Merchant Hotel (Belfast), in Ireland
 Merchant Tower also known as Merchant's Hotel, in Campbellsville, Kentucky
 Merchants Hotel (St. Paul), Minnesota
 Merchant Hotel (Portland, Oregon)
 Merchants Manor Hotel